Manuel María de Toro y Dumont, 3rd Count of la Conquista  (1798 - April 5, 1818) was a Spanish nobleman who fought with the Royalist troops during the Chilean War of Independence.

Life
He was born in Madrid, the eldest son of Gregorio José de Toro and of his wife Josefa Dumont y Michel. He became Count at the death of his father in 1816, at the young age of 18. He fought with the Spanish Army against independence, and went into exile in Perú with the remains of the Royalist army after the defeat at the Battle of Chacabuco in 1817, while the pro-independence government confiscated all his properties.

He returned the next year with the army of Brigadier Mariano Osorio, of whom he had become personal adjuntant. He was killed a few months later during the Battle of Maipu, and was in turn succeeded to the title by his sister, María Nicolasa.

Additional information

See also
Chilean Independence

Sources

1798 births
1818 deaths
Manuel 03
People of the Chilean War of Independence